Nedgame is a video game retailer in the Netherlands, and is with its 11 stores the biggest privately owned video game retailer in the Netherlands. They specialize in selling new and used games, consoles, accessories and game merchandise.

In September 2009, Nedgame's decision not to support Sony's new PSP Go made international headlines, as a number of video game retailers worldwide followed.

References

Video game retailers
Video game companies of the Netherlands

External links